Gendebelo (also called Gende Belo) was an ancient Muslim trading city in Ethiopia. Its location was discovered in 2009 by a team of French archaeologists.

History
Gendebelo was a medieval Muslim trading center thought to be lost. Gendebelo was "a great mercantile city", where camel caravans brought all kinds of spices except ginger (which was grown locally) from the port of Zeila. Although Ethiopia is known as the second oldest Christian country in the world, about half of its population is Muslim. Gendebelo was a place of peaceful trade between the Christian and Muslim cultures.

Discovery
In 2009, French archaeologists François-Xavier Fauvelle-Aymar and Bertrand Hirsch discovered the site as a medieval city now known as Nora, which has been abandoned for years except for the mosque.

An old Ajami manuscript helped the archaeologists determine the city's location. Italian scholar and Ethiopia expert Enrico Cerulli had found the manuscript in the Muslim city of Harar in 1936, where it was being used to wrap sugar. The archaeologists also used the writings of Alessandro Zorzi, a 16th-century Venetian explorer who had found the ruins of Gendebelo in the desert and referred to it as "the place where mules are to be unloaded and camels take over."

References

External links
CNN Traveler "Lost and Found, The recent discovery of the remains of a number of ancient cities in Ethiopia has rekindled debate about the country’s remarkable past. Yves Stranger reports."

History of Ethiopia